Richard Eddy may refer to:

 Richard Eddy (clergyman) (1828–1906), American Universalist clergyman
 Richard Eddy (politician) (1882–1955), New Zealand labourer, trade unionist andmember of the New Zealand Legislative Council